"Now You're Gone" is a song by Scottish singer-songwriter Tom Walker featuring vocals from Swedish singer Zara Larsson. The song was released as a digital download on 31 May 2019 as the seventh single from his debut studio album What a Time to Be Alive. The song was written by Tom Walker, Chelcee Grimes and Steve McCutcheon who also produced the song. In 2019 during concert Jingle Bell Ball he performed a Christmassy rendition of Basshunter's "Now You're Gone".

Music video
A music video to accompany the release of "Now You're Gone" was first released onto YouTube on 31 May 2019.

Track listing

Charts

Certifications

References

2019 singles
2019 songs
Tom Walker (singer) songs
Zara Larsson songs
Songs written by Tom Walker (singer)
Songs written by Chelcee Grimes
Songs written by Steve Mac
Song recordings produced by Steve Mac